Tropical Storm Olaf was an erratic and long-lived tropical cyclone that brought heavy rainfall to regions of Mexico, which would be devastated by Hurricane Pauline a week later. The sixteenth named storm of the 1997 season, Olaf formed on September 26 off the southern coast of Mexico. It moved northward and quickly intensified, reaching peak winds of  before weakening and hitting Oaxaca as a tropical depression. In Mexico, El Salvador, and Guatemala, the system brought heavy rainfall, which killed 18 people and caused flooding and damage. It was originally thought that Olaf dissipated over Mexico, although its remnants continued westward for a week. It interacted with Hurricane Pauline, which caused Olaf to turn to the southeast and later to the north to strike Mexico again, finally dissipating on October 12.

Meteorological history

The origins of Olaf were from a tropical wave first noted over Central America on September 22. It moved slowly through the eastern Pacific Ocean, and gradually developed an area of convection. Concurrently, an upper-level low-pressure area moved from the Gulf of Mexico across Mexico into the Pacific, which produced wind shear across the region; wind shear is the difference in wind speed and direction in the atmosphere, and is usually harmful to tropical cyclogenesis. The disturbance associated with the tropical wave persisted and developed outflow. This caused the upper-level low to move away from the system.

A few hours after developing, the depression attained tropical storm status, or winds of at least . Upon doing so, the National Hurricane Center (NHC) gave it the name "Olaf". The upper-level low, which was moving away from the region, caused the storm to move northward toward the Mexican coast. Olaf quickly intensified, as evidenced by reports from a nearby ship, and the winds reached  by late on September 27; the NHC anticipated further intensification to hurricane status, or winds of at least . Instead, interaction with the rough terrain of Mexico caused weakening. Olaf made landfall on Salina Cruz, Oaxaca early on September 29 as a  tropical depression. Within a few hours, the circulation was not evident on satellite imagery, and the NHC discontinued advisories.

Despite being considered dissipated, a re-analysis of satellite imagery indicated the circulation of Olaf persisted as turned to the west toward open waters. Early on September 30, the system reached the Pacific, and it continued westward for about a week, during which it retained some convective activity. On October 5, Olaf turned toward the east, as it interacted with the large circulation of developing Hurricane Pauline. The system turned to the southeast, and, failing to organize, the NHC discontinued advisories on October 8. Late on October 12, the circulation of Olaf made its final landfall near Manzanillo, Colima, and it quickly dissipated. An associated area of thunderstorms moved over open waters again, but failed to redevelop.

Impact and preparations

Prior to moving ashore, a tropical storm warning was issued from Punta Maldonado, Guerrero to Tapachula, Chiapas and the Port of Chiapas, near the Mexico–Guatemala border. When Olaf was strengthening faster than anticipated, the advisory was upgraded to a hurricane warning, although it was downgraded to a tropical storm after the intensification did not occur. Upon making its first landfall, Tropical Depression Olaf produced gusty winds and heavy rains along the southeastern coast of Mexico. Heavy rainfall was also reported in Guatemala and El Salvador.

Across the affected region, the heavy rainfall caused flooding, which resulted in 18 deaths. In Mexico, the flooding damaged  of coffee, corn, and other crops; in Chiapas, the coffee crop damage represented a severe cut into the yearly total. The precipitation flooded many buildings across the region, including 30 houses in the Chiapas capital of Tuxtla Gutiérrez, when a river exceeded its banks. In mountainous regions, mudslides left dozens of small villages isolated from the outside world. Along the coast, high waves of up to  forced the closure of all ports in three Mexican states, which affected thousands of fishermen. Further west, three fishing vessels were reported missing near Acapulco, prompting rescue parties. The storm also forced the closure of several airports.

Following the storm, the Mexican government sent food, water, and housing supplies to affected families in Oaxaca. Less than a week after Olaf moved through southern Mexico, Hurricane Pauline struck the same region with much stronger winds. Pauline caused heavier rainfall and more damage, killing at least 250 people. Some regions received 10 days of heavy rainfall.

See also
Other tropical cyclones named Olaf

References

Eastern Pacific tropical storms
1997 Pacific hurricane season
1997 in Mexico
Hurricanes in El Salvador
Hurricanes in Guatemala
Hurricanes in Oaxaca
Hurricanes in Colima
Hurricanes in Chiapas